Sport Grupo Sacavenense is a Portuguese football club founded 1911 and located in Sacavém, Portugal. Portugal international midfielder Joao Palhinha played for the club's academy between 2009 and 2012.

Colours and badge 
Sacavenense's badge and colours are red and black.

External links 
 Official website
 Soccerway Profile
 FPF Profile
 Fora de Jogo Profile

Football clubs in Portugal
Association football clubs established in 1910
1910 establishments in Portugal